John Hogan  is a Canadian politician, who was elected to the Newfoundland and Labrador House of Assembly in the 2021 provincial election. He represents the electoral district of Windsor Lake as a member of the Liberal Party of Newfoundland and Labrador.

Hogan is a graduate of Memorial University (BSc, 2000) and Dalhousie University (LLB, 2003). Hogan was called to the Ontario bar in 2004. He then returned to Newfoundland and Labrador where he was called to the bar in 2005. In 2014, Hogan started his own law firm, WPH Law. He has previously served on two occasions as an elected member to the Memorial University Board of Regents. Hogan served as counsel for the provincial Consumer Advocate at the Commission of Inquiry Respecting the Muskrat Falls Project.

On April 8, 2021, Hogan was appointed Minister of Justice and Public Safety and Attorney General.

Election results

References

Living people
Liberal Party of Newfoundland and Labrador MHAs
21st-century Canadian politicians
Year of birth missing (living people)
Members of the Executive Council of Newfoundland and Labrador